Moral Inquiries on the Situation of Man and of Brutes is an 1824 book by Lewis Gompertz, an early animal rights advocate and vegan. In the book, Gompertz lays out a moral framework for the treatment of and obligations towards humans and other animals, arguing against the consumption of meat, milk, eggs, silk and leather, denouncing vivisection and arguing for aiding animals suffering in the wild.

Reception 
One contemporary reviewer called the structuring of the book "puzzling", yet felt that Gompertz laid out "excellent principles, as applied to all points of a public nature" and that the "tendency of most of the author's proposals and observations is humane and laudable"; they concluded that despite certain faults in the book's judgements, that it deserved the "attention of magistrates and men in power".

Legacy 
In 1839, the astronomer and naturalist T. Forster published a treatise addressed to Gompertz, titled Philozoia, or Moral Reflections on the actual condition of the Animal Kingdom, and the means of improving the same.

Henry S. Salt included Gompertz's book in his bibliography of animal rights, within his 1892 work Animals' Rights: Considered in Relation to Social Progress.

Gary L. Francione and Anne E. Charlton describe the book as "one of the most progressive and radical books on animal ethics ever written, yet is virtually unknown". Peter Singer, in the foreword to the 1992 edition of the book, details his surprise at having discovered Gompertz's work and recognising Gompertz's arguments as being very similar to his own, which have been taken up by the animal liberation movement. 

Stephen Bostock draws attention to how Gompertz's investigation of ethics "attempts to argue rigorously from firm foundations with an elaborate apparatus of definitions, axioms and theorems". He also praises the fairness Gompertz gives to his opponents and his honesty about his doubts. Bostock also asserts that Gompertz's answers to a number of contemporary ethical questions are "well worth the attention of anyone tackling these questions today."

Editions 
In 1992, Centaur Press published a new edition of the book, which was edited by Peter Singer; this was followed by a 1997 edition published by Edwin Mellen Press and edited by Charles R. Magel.

References

External links
 Moral Inquiries on the Situation of Man and of Brutes at the Internet Archive

1824 non-fiction books
Animal ethics books
Books about animal rights
Books about animal testing
Books about human rights
Books about veganism
Books about wild animal suffering